Celio Piccolomini (1609–1681) was a Roman Catholic cardinal.

Biography
Celio Piccolomini was born in Siena in 1609. On 29 October 1656, he was consecrated bishop by Giulio Cesare Sacchetti, Cardinal-Bishop of Sabina, with Carlo de' Vecchi, Bishop of Chiusi, and Francesco Rinuccini, Bishop of Pistoia e Prato, serving as co-consecrators.

He was named Apostolic Nuncio to France on 15 November 1656 and served until 30 August 1663.

He was made a cardinal on 14 January 1664. He participated in the conclaves that elected Pope Clement IX in 1667, Pope Clement X in 1670, and Pope Innocent XI in 1676.

He was named Archbishop of Siena on 18 March 1681.

He was the principal consecrator of François de Laval de Montmorency, Titular Bishop of Petra in Palaestina (1658); Bonaventura Cavalli, Bishop of Caserta (1668); and Vincenzo Maffia, Bishop of Patti (1671).

References

1609 births
1681 deaths
17th-century Italian cardinals
Cardinals created by Pope Alexander VII
Apostolic Nuncios to France